Chuck Fletcher (born April 29, 1967) is a Canadian professional ice hockey executive. He most recently was the general manager and president of the Philadelphia Flyers of the National Hockey League (NHL). He was relieved of his duties by the Flyers on March 10, 2023.

Career
Fletcher was assistant general manager of the Florida Panthers from their expansion year in 1993 until 2002.  From 2002 to 2006, Fletcher served as the director of hockey operations, assistant general manager, and vice president of amateur scouting/player development for the Anaheim Ducks.  Fletcher then served for three years as the assistant general manager for the Pittsburgh Penguins under Ray Shero.  Fletcher was hired as general manager of the Minnesota Wild, on May 21, 2009, a position he held until April 23, 2018.

On April 23, 2018, the Wild owner, Craig Leopold, announced that the organization would not renew Fletcher's contract effectively ending his nine-year tenure with the club.

On December 3, 2018, Fletcher was hired by the Philadelphia Flyers as their new general manager. He is the ninth general manager in Flyers' franchise history (eighth person to be general manager) and the first since 1990 who was not previously a player on the team. When Paul Holmgren resigned as president, Fletcher succeeded him, taking the positions of President and general manager (alongside Valerie Camillo who is also President).

On March 10, 2023, the Flyers announced that they had fired Fletcher.

Personal life
A Montreal native, Fletcher is a Harvard University graduate (1990), and spent a year working as the sales and merchandising coordinator for Hockey Canada and two years as a player representative for Newport Sports Management before making the transition to front office work with the Florida Panthers. He lives in Voorhees, New Jersey, with his wife Rhonda, with whom he has two children. His father is well-known ice hockey executive and former general manager Cliff Fletcher.

References

1967 births
Living people
Anaheim Ducks executives
Anaheim Ducks scouts
Anglophone Quebec people
Florida Panthers general managers
Harvard University alumni
Minnesota Wild general managers
National Hockey League executives
National Hockey League general managers
People from Adams County, Pennsylvania
Philadelphia Flyers executives
Pittsburgh Penguins executives
Ice hockey people from Montreal